Pääjärvi is a medium-sized lake in Finland. It is situated on the border between the city of Hämeenlinna in the Tavastia Proper region and the municipality of Hollola in the Päijänne Tavastia region.

The lake drains through the Teuronjoki river into the lake Mommilanjärvi and from there through the Puujoki River into Lake Kernaalanjärvi and from there through the Hiidenjoki River into Lake Vanajavesi and it is thus a part of the Kokemäenjoki basin that drains the western third of the Finnish Lakeland.

See also
List of lakes in Finland

References

Kokemäenjoki basin
Hämeenlinna
Landforms of Kanta-Häme
Lakes of Hollola